The women's 400 metre individual medley competition of the 2018 FINA World Swimming Championships (25 m) was held on 11 December 2018.

Records
Prior to the competition, the existing world and championship records were as follows.

Results

Heats
The heats were started at 11:05.

Final
The final was held at 19:48.

References

Women's 400 metre individual medley